Anoop Mishra (born 16 May 1956) is an Indian politician from the Bharatiya Janata Party (BJP). He was elected as a Member of parliament, Lok Sabha from Morena, Madhya Pradesh. He was elected as a Member of the Legislative Assembly of Madhya Pradesh State. He last  represented the Gwalior East constituency during 2008–2013. Mishra is nephew of former Prime Minister of India Atal Bihari Vajpayee.

Positions held

Contribution during 16th Parliament

Question details of Anoop Mishra (questions asked)

References

India MPs 2014–2019
1956 births
Living people
Lok Sabha members from Madhya Pradesh
Madhya Pradesh MLAs 2008–2013
People from Gwalior
Bharatiya Janata Party politicians from Madhya Pradesh